Zane Musgrove (born 26 March 1996) is a Samoa international rugby league footballer who plays as a  for the St George Illawarra Dragons in the NRL.

He previously played for the South Sydney Rabbitohs and  Wests Tigers in the National Rugby League.

Background
Born in Auckland, New Zealand, Musgrove is of Samoan and  Māori  descent and played his junior rugby league for Counties Manukau and the Mangere East Hawks. He was then signed by the South Sydney Rabbitohs.

Playing career

Early career
In 2014 and 2015, Musgrove played for the South Sydney Rabbitohs' NYC team, although for the majority of 2015, he played for the North Sydney Bears in the New South Wales Cup. He finished that year with 13 games and scoring 1 try for North Sydney.

2016
In round 1 of the 2016 NRL season, Musgrove made his NRL debut for South Sydney against the Sydney Roosters. In November, he extended his contract with South Sydney from the end of 2017 until the end of 2020.

2017
Musgrove made 21 appearances for Souths in the 2017 NRL season but his team failed to make the finals for the second straight season.

2018
In the 2018 season, injuries and suspension prevented Musgrove from making a single appearance for Souths, playing twice for their feeder club, the North Sydney Bears, instead. He was suspended from club activities following a domestic violence charge, but that was lifted after he indicated his intention to plead not guilty. He was ultimately charged with property damage, which was overturned on appeal.

In November the West Tigers announced they had signed Musgrove for three years. He was released from his contract with the Souths, and began pre-season training with the Tigers.

In December, Musgrove was charged with indecent assault for an alleged incident at the Coogee Bay Hotel that occurred two days after he signed with the Wests Tigers. In January 2019 he pleaded not guilty.

2019
On 1 March, the NRL announced that they had refused to register Musgrove's contract until the players legal issues were finalized.  A statement from the NRL read "A request by the Wests Tigers to register Zane Musgrove, who is currently facing indecent assault charges, has been refused until the case is concluded".

On 29 November, it was announced that Musgrove was allowed to resume training with the Wests Tigers after being cleared by the NRL.

2021
On 31 January, Musgrove and fellow NRL player Asu Kepaoa were detained by the police after allegedly abusing officers and refusing to move on from outside of the Coogee Bay Hotel. They were released without charge, however Kepaoa was issued with an infringement notice.  The matter was then passed on to the NRL Integrity Unit.

On the 20th of February Musgrove represented the  Māori All Stars in the 10-10 draw against the  Indigenous All Stars.

Musgrove was limited to only five matches for the Wests Tigers in the 2021 NRL season as the club finished 13th and missed the finals.

2022
On 7 January, it was revealed that Musgrove would need to attend Waverley Local Court on 12 January in relation to a driving offence which dated back to November 2021.   It was alleged that Musgrove had been stopped by police for driving without headlights on.  After the police conducted further checks they discovered that Musgrove was driving on a suspended licence.
Musgrove played a total of 24 matches for the Wests Tigers in the 2022 NRL season as the club finished bottom of the table and claimed the Wooden Spoon for the first time.
On 19 October, Musgrove signed a two-year deal to join St. George Illawarra starting in 2023.

2023
On 21 February, Musgrove was issued with a breach notice and fined by St. George Illawarra after he was involved in an altercation with teammate Mikaele Ravalawa following the clubs Charity Shield loss to South Sydney in Mudgee. It was alleged that both players were heavily intoxicated after a night out of drinking following the game.

Assault allegations

In May 2018 Musgrove was involved in an argument with his former girlfriend, and on 11 July, faced charges of common assault, common assault domestic violence related, and intentionally or recklessly destroy/damage property. Musgrove pleaded not guilty. On 19 September, Musgrove pleaded guilty to damaging property and was fined $1,100 and ordered to pay $500 to fix the gate which Musgrove damaged after having an argument with his girlfriend. Musgrove also faced charges of domestic violence related common assault and assault, but both charges were withdrawn by prosecutors. In November Musgrove's sentence was overturned on appeal, and he was given a conditional release order and required to be on good behaviour.

In December 2018, Musgrove was charged by police for allegedly assaulting a woman at the Coogee Bay Hotel. Musgrove and Liam Coleman, son of former Souths player Craig Coleman were charged with an act of indecency and aggravated indecent assault. A woman made a complaint to security and a further complaint was made to Eastern Beaches police local area command. Musgrove attended Maroubra police station later that week where he was granted conditional bail. In January 2019 he pleaded not guilty to aggravated indecent assault, indecent assault and common assault.

On 21 October 2019, Musgrove was found guilty of assault with an act of indecency and sentenced to a 12-month intensive corrections order.

In April 2020, Musgrove had his assault conviction from 2019 overturned by the court.

References

External links

South Sydney Rabbitohs profile
Rabbitohs profile
2017 RLWC profile

1996 births
Living people
New Zealand rugby league players
New Zealand sportspeople of Samoan descent
South Sydney Rabbitohs players
Counties Manukau rugby league team players
Mangere East Hawks players
North Sydney Bears NSW Cup players
Western Suburbs Magpies NSW Cup players
Rugby league players from Auckland
Rugby league props
Wests Tigers players
St. George Illawarra Dragons players